Eriogaster is a genus of moths in the family Lasiocampidae first described by Ernst Friedrich Germar in 1810.

Species
Eriogaster acanthophylli Christoph, 1882
Eriogaster arbusculae Freyer, 1849
Eriogaster catax (Linnaeus, 1758)
Eriogaster czipkai  Lajonquiére, 1975
Eriogaster daralagesia Zolotuhin, 1991
Eriogaster henkei Staudinger, 1879
Eriogaster lanestris (Linnaeus, 1758) - small eggar
Eriogaster neogena Fischer von Waldheim, 1824
Eriogaster nippei de Freina, 1988
Eriogaster pfeifferi Daniel, 1932
Eriogaster reshoefti Schulte & Witt, 1975
Eriogaster rimicola (Denis & Schiffermüller, 1775)

References

External links

 
Lasiocampidae
Taxonomy articles created by Polbot